Video Code Engine (VCE, was earlier referred to as Video Coding Engine, Video Compression Engine or Video Codec Engine in official AMD documentation) is AMD's video encoding application-specific integrated circuit implementing the video codec H.264/MPEG-4 AVC. Since 2012 it was integrated into all of their GPUs and APUs except Oland.

VCE was introduced with the Radeon HD 7000 Series on 22 December 2011. VCE occupies a considerable amount of the die surface at the time of its introduction and is not to be confused with AMD's Unified Video Decoder (UVD).

As of AMD Raven Ridge (released January 2018), UVD and VCE were succeeded by Video Core Next (VCN).

Overview

The handling of video data involves computation of data compression algorithms and possibly of video processing algorithms. As the template compression methods shows, lossy video compression algorithms involve the steps: motion estimation (ME), discrete cosine transform (DCT), and entropy encoding (EC).

AMD Video Code Engine (VCE) is a full hardware implementation of the video codec H.264/MPEG-4 AVC. It is capable of delivering 1080p at 60 frames/sec. Because its entropy encoding block is also a separately accessible Video Codec Engine, it can be operated in two modes: full-fixed mode and hybrid mode.

By employing AMD APP SDK, available for Linux and Microsoft Windows, developers can create hybrid encoders that pair custom motion estimation, inverse discrete cosine transform and motion compensation with the hardware entropy encoding to achieve faster than real-time encoding. In hybrid mode, only the entropy encoding block of the VCE unit is used, while the remaining computation is offloaded to the 3D engine of the GPU, so the computing scales with the number of available compute units (CUs).

VCE 1.0
As of April 2014, there are two versions of VCE. Version 1.0 supports H.264 YUV420 (I & P frames), H.264 SVC Temporal Encode VCE, and Display Encode Mode (DEM).

It can be found on: 
 Piledriver-based
 Trinity APUs (Ax-5xxx, e.g. A10-5800K)
 Richland APUs (Ax-6xxx, e.g. A10-6800K)
 GPUs of the Southern Islands generation (GCN1: CAYMAN, ARUBA (Trinity/Richland), CAPE VERDE, PITCAIRN, TAHITI). These are
 Radeon HD 7700 series (except HD 7790 with VCE 2.0)
 Radeon HD 7800 series 
 Radeon HD 7900 series
 Radeon HD 8570 to 8990 (except HD 8770 with VCE 2.0)
 Radeon R7 250E, 250X, 265 / R9 270, 270X, 280, 280X
 Radeon R7 360, 370, 455 / R9 370, 370X
 Mobile Radeon HD 77x0M to HD 7970M
 Mobile Radeon HD 8000-Series
 Mobile Radeon Rx M2xx Series (except R9 M280X with VCE 2.0 and R9 M295X with VCE 3.0)
 Mobile Radeon R5 M330 to R9 M390
 FirePro cards with 1st Generation GCN (GCN1) (Except W2100, which is Oland XT)

VCE 2.0
Compared to the first version, VCE 2.0 adds H.264 YUV444 (I-Frames), B-frames for H.264 YUV420, and improvements to the DEM (Display Encode Mode), which results in a better encoding quality.

It can be found on:
 Steamroller-based
 Kaveri APUs (Ax-7xxx, e.g. A10-7850K)
 Godavari APUs (Ax-7xxx, e.g. A10-7890K)
 Jaguar-based
 Kabini APUs (e.g. Athlon 5350, Sempron 2650)
 Temash APUs (e.g. A6-1450, A4-1200)
 Puma-based
 Beema and Mullins
 GPUs of the Sea Islands generation as well Bonaire or Hawaii GPUs (2nd Generation Graphics Core Next), such as
 Radeon HD 7790, 8770 
 Radeon R7 260, 260X / R9 290, 290X, 295X2
 Radeon R7 360 / R9 390, 390X
 Mobile Radeon R9 M280X 
 Mobile Radeon R9 M385, M385X
 Mobile Radeon R9 M470, M470X
 FirePro cards with 2nd Generation GCN (GCN2)

VCE 3.0
Video Code Engine 3.0 (VCE 3.0) technology features a new high-quality video scaling and - since version 3.4 - High Efficiency Video Coding (HEVC/H.265).

It, together with UVD 6.0, can be found on 3rd generation of Graphics Core Next (GCN3) with "Tonga", "Fiji", "Iceland", and "Carrizo" (VCE 3.1) based graphics controller hardware, which is now used AMD Radeon Rx 300 Series (Pirate Islands GPU family) and VCE 3.4 by actual AMD Radeon Rx 400 Series and AMD Radeon 500 Series (both Polaris GPU family).

 Tonga: Radeon R9 285, 380, 380X; Mobile Radeon R9 M390X, M395, M395X, M485X
 Tonga XT: FirePro W7100, S7100X, S7150, S7150 X2
 Fiji: Radeon R9 Fury, Fury X, Nano; Radeon Pro Duo (2016); FirePro S9300, W7170M
 Polaris: RX 460, 470, 480; RX 550, 560, 570, 580; Radeon Pro Duo (2017)

VCE 4.0
The Video Code Engine 4.0 encoder and UVD 7.0 decoder are included in the Vega-based GPUs.

VCE 4.1
AMD's Vega20 GPU, present in the Instinct Mi50, Instinct Mi60 and Radeon VII cards, include VCE 4.1 and two UVD 7.2 instances.

Feature overview

APUs

GPUs

Operating system support
The VCE SIP core needs to be supported by the device driver. The device driver provides one or multiple interfaces, e. g. OpenMAX IL. One of these interfaces is then used by end-user software, like GStreamer or HandBrake (HandBrake rejected VCE support in December 2016, but added it in December 2018), to access the VCE hardware and make use of it.

AMD's proprietary device driver AMD Catalyst is available for multiple operating systems and support for VCE was added to it. Additionally, a free device driver is available. This driver also supports the VCE hardware.

Linux

 Initial VCE support was added on 4 February 2014 by Christian König of AMD to the free radeon driver.
 Gallium3D state tracker for OpenMAX was added 24 October 2013 to Mesa 3D.
 The free and open-source Radeon driver was adapted to use OpenMAX with the GStreamer OpenMAX (gst-omx) support for exposing the VCE video encode engine.
 AMD employee Leo Liu implemented h264 level support into the Mesa 3D state tracker.

Windows
The software "MediaShow Espresso Video Transcoding" seems to utilize VCE and UVD to the fullest extent possible.

XSplit Broadcaster supports VCE from version 1.3.

Open Broadcaster Software (OBS Studio) supports VCE for recording and streaming. The original Open Broadcaster Software (OBS) requires a fork build in order to enable VCE.

AMD Radeon Software supports VCE with built in game capture ("Radeon ReLive") and use AMD AMF/VCE on APU or Radeon Graphics card to reduce FPS drop when capturing game or video content.

HandBrake added Video Coding Engine support in version 1.2.0 in December 2018.

Successor

The VCE was succeeded by AMD Video Core Next in the Raven Ridge series of APUs released in October 2017. The VCN combines both encode (VCE) and decode (UVD).

See also

Video hardware technologies

AMD 

 Video Core Next - AMD
 Video Coding Engine - AMD
 Unified Video Decoder - AMD
 Video Shader - ATI

Others 

 Intel Quick Sync Video – Intel's equivalent SIP core
 Nvidia NVENC – Nvidia's equivalent SIP core
Qualcomm Hexagon - Qualcomm's equivalent SIP core

References

Video acceleration
AMD IP cores
Video compression and decompression ASIC